The Women's ski slopestyle competition at the FIS Freestyle Ski and Snowboarding World Championships 2023 was held on 27 and 28 February 2023.

Qualification
The qualification was started on 27 February at 10:00. The twelve best skiers qualified for the final.

Final
The final was started on 28 February at 13:30.

References

Women's ski slopestyle